The Adventure R series is a family of French paramotors that was designed and produced by Adventure SA of Méré, Yonne for powered paragliding. Now out of production, when they were available the aircraft were supplied complete and ready-to-fly.

Design and development
The R (for Radne) series was designed as a very lightweight paramotor, to comply with the US FAR 103 Ultralight Vehicles rules as well as European microlight rules. It features a paraglider-style wing, single-place accommodation and a single  Radne Raket 120 engine in pusher configuration with a 3:1 ratio reduction drive, driving a  diameter wooden, fixed pitch propeller. As is the case with all paramotors, take-off and landing is accomplished by foot.

The aircraft is built from aluminium tubing, with a nylon seat and harness. Inflight steering is accomplished via handles that actuate the canopy brakes, creating roll and yaw.

Variants
R2
Initial version, powered by a single  Radne Raket 120 engine
R3
Follow-on version, also powered by a single  Radne Raket 120 engine
R3E
Follow-on version, also powered by a single  Radne Raket 120 engine

Specifications (R2)

References

R series
2000s French ultralight aircraft
Single-engined pusher aircraft
Paramotors